Paropsia is a genus of flowering plants belonging to the family Passifloraceae.

Its native range is Tropical and Southern Africa.

Species
Species:

Paropsia braunii 
Paropsia brazzaeana 
Paropsia edulis 
Paropsia gabonica 
Paropsia grandiflora 
Paropsia grewioides 
Paropsia guineensis 
Paropsia humblotii 
Paropsia madagascariensis 
Paropsia obscura 
Paropsia perrieri 
Paropsia vareciformis

References

Passifloraceae
Malpighiales genera